The 1924 New Hampshire football team was an American football team that represented the University of New Hampshire as a member of the New England Conference during the 1924 college football season. In its ninth season under head coach William "Butch" Cowell, the team compiled a 7–2 record, and outscored opponents by a total of 213 to 49. The team played its home games in Durham, New Hampshire, at Memorial Field.

Schedule

Cy Wentworth, team captain for a second consecutive season, was an inaugural member of the UNH Wildcats Hall of Fame in 1982.

Notes

References

New Hampshire
New Hampshire Wildcats football seasons
New Hampshire football